The Central District of Siahkal County is a district (bakhsh) in Siahkal County, Gilan Province, Iran. At the 2006 census, its population was 34,270, in 9,546 families.  The District has one city: Siahkal. The District has three rural districts (dehestan): Khara Rud Rural District, Malfejan Rural District, and Tutaki Rural District.

References 

Siahkal County
Districts of Gilan Province